Drexel Wellington Gomez (born 24 January 1937) is a Bahamian Anglican bishop.

Life and ministry
Gomez was born on the Berry Islands in the Bahamas. He graduated from St Chad's College, Durham University, in 1959.  He was enthroned and consecrated as Lord Bishop of Barbados in the Cathedral Church of St. Michael on 25 June 1972 and then in 1997 was elected the Bishop of the Diocese of The Bahamas and the Turks and Caicos Islands.

Gomez was elected Archbishop and Primate of the Province of the West Indies in 1996. His full title became His Grace the Most Reverend Drexel Wellington Gomez, Lord Archbishop, Metropolitan and Primate of the Church of the West Indies & Bishop of the Diocese Of Nassau & The Bahamas (Including the Turks & Caicos Islands).

Along with Archbishop Peter Akinola, Anglican Primate of Nigeria, Gomez was a leading opponent of the ordination of non-celibate gay people as Anglican clergy, an issue that escalated into a crisis for the Anglican Communion following the consecration of an openly non-celibate gay priest, Gene Robinson, as the Bishop of New Hampshire in the United States in 2003.

In October 2003, Gomez was appointed to the Lambeth Commission on Communion by the Archbishop of Canterbury, Rowan Williams. The commission produced the Report of the Lambeth Commission on Communion (also known as The Windsor Report and the Eames Report), published in October 2004.

In August 2007, Gomez was the main preacher at a service at which several Anglican archbishops consecrated two American priests as bishops despite the opposition of the Episcopal Church in the United States of America. Gomez accused the American church of "aggressive revisionist theology" and teaching lies.

Gomez retired as bishop and archbishop in 2009.

Works

Liturgical works
 D. W. Gomez (contributor), A companion to the 1975 experimental rite for the celebration of the Holy Eucharist: prepared for experimental use in the Province of the West Indies / the Provincial Liturgical Commission, the Church in the Province of the West Indies. (1976)
 D. W. Gomez (ed.), True Union in the Body?  A contribution to the discussion within the Anglican Communion concerning the public blessing of same-sex unions (Oxford, 2002), p. 3.

References

1939 births
Living people
20th-century Anglican archbishops
21st-century Anglican archbishops
Alumni of St Chad's College, Durham
Bahamian Anglicans
Anglican bishops of Nassau
Anglican archbishops of the West Indies
Anglican bishops of Barbados
People from the Berry Islands
Anglican realignment people